Piet Damen (born 20 July 1934) is a Dutch former professional racing cyclist. He rode the Tour de France in 1958–1961 and 1964 with the best result of 11th place in 1958. Damen won the Peace Race in 1958.

References

External links
 

1934 births
Living people
Dutch male cyclists
Cyclists from North Brabant
People from Laarbeek